Mefjell Glacier is a glacier,  long, flowing northwest into Gjel Glacier between Menipa Peak and Mefjell Mountain in the Sør Rondane Mountains of Antarctica. It was mapped by Norwegian cartographers in 1957 from air photos taken by U.S. Navy Operation Highjump, 1946–47, and named Mefjellbreen (the middle-mountain glacier).

See also
 List of glaciers in the Antarctic
 Glaciology

References

Glaciers of Queen Maud Land
Princess Ragnhild Coast